Apollo Perelini (born 16 July 1969) is a former dual-code international rugby union and rugby league footballer who played in the 1990s and 2000s, and has coached in the 2000s and 2010s.

Background
Perelini was born in Auckland, New Zealand. He was named 'Apollo 11' because he was born on the day that the Apollo space project was launched.

He is a New Zealand national.

Playing career
Perelini played for St. Helens in the Championship and the Super League. He also played for Sale Sharks in the Zurich Championship and North Harbour in New Zealand.

In the 1991 Rugby Union World Cup he played as an open side flanker, in the Samoans' four games (against Scotland, Wales, Argentina and Australia). During the World Cup he gained the nickname of 'Terminator' for his fierce, hard-hitting tackling technique. In 1994 he received an approach from St. Helens to play rugby league in England. At first he rejected it, but finally agreed. In 1995 he played for rugby league for Samoa in the Rugby League World Cup, making him the first Samoan to play in World Cups in both codes.

At the age of 33, after finishing his rugby league playing career, he returned to rugby union to play for the Sale Sharks.

Post playing
After retiring from playing he joined the Sale's Coaching staff. In 2004 he returned to St Helens as the team's Head of Strength and Conditioning and Skills coach. Apollo helped St Helens to 4 Challenge Cup titles 2004, 2006, 2007 and 2008. 4 League Leaders titles 2005, 2006, 2007 and 2008. 1 World Club Championship 2007. 1 Grand Final Winners 2006, and also picking up the prestigious BBC sports Team Of The Year in 2006.

He now lives in Dubai where he was formerly the Director of Sport at Repton School Dubai, a private school. He currently runs two sporting Academies - Apollo Perelini Rugby Skills Academy (www.aprsa.com) and JETS (a female football academy), at an increasing number of venues around the emirate.

Apollo is also the current head coach of the UAE National Rugby team, a position which he started in 2015 for the UAERF. Apollo spoke about what makes the Rugby Sevens so special and the role that rugby has in the Dubai history in the This Luxury Life podcast show.

References

External links
 Saints Heritage Society profile
 Apollo Perelini at New Zealand Rugby History

Living people
1969 births
Dual-code rugby internationals
Expatriate rugby union players in England
New Zealand expatriate rugby union players
New Zealand expatriate sportspeople in England
New Zealand expatriate sportspeople in the United Arab Emirates
New Zealand rugby league players
New Zealand rugby union players
North Harbour rugby union players
Rugby league props
Rugby league second-rows
Sale Sharks players
Samoa international rugby union players
Samoa national rugby league team players
Samoan sportspeople
St Helens R.F.C. players